Anti-Money Laundering Office, Executive Yuan (AMLO) is an agency of the Government of the Republic of China to deal with money laundering matters in Executive Yuan.

History
The office was established on 16 March 2017, five years after the second round of an Asia/Pacific Group on Money Laundering performance review stated that Taiwan's existing laws regarding money laundering did not conform to international standards. Premier Lin Chuan stated at the opening ceremony that the office will help build a more transparent and orderly financial environment in Taiwan. Deputy Minister of Justice Tsai Pi-chung was appointed as the office's first director.

Directors
 Tsai Pi-chung (since 2017)

See also
 Crime in Taiwan

References

External links

 

2017 establishments in Taiwan
Anti-money laundering measures
Executive Yuan
Government agencies established in 2017
Government of Taiwan